Tien Chu Ve-Tsin Chemical Limited is a Chinese manufacturer of honey by-products, food chemicals and additives including monosodium glutamate or MSG.

Founded in Shanghai in 1921, the firm also had operations in Hong Kong (established in 1937). Wu Zhifan became CEO of Tien Chu Ve-Tsin.

Following the establishment of the People's Republic of China, Tien Chu Ve-Tsin became a state owned enterprise. It is currently owned by Shanghai Industrial Holdings.

The Hong Kong unit became Tien Chu Ve-Tsin Chemical Limited of Hong Kong in the 1950s, but it reunited with the mainland parent firm in 1981. The factory was located in Tokwawan, Kowloon.

Tien Chu was awarded a gold prize at the 1933 World's Fair in Chicago.

Tien Chu products are now found overseas in Chinese supermarkets and sold in plastic bags or blue and gold tins.

The Tokwawan location closed and demolished in 1999 to make way for Sky Tower residential block.

Rival and larger MSG maker is Ajinomoto of Japan. Ajinomoto began 12 years before (1909) Tien Chu with offices in Shanghai and Hong Kong.

Facilities

See also

References

External links
 Tien Chu Homepage

1923 establishments in China
Chemical companies of China
Manufacturing companies based in Shanghai
Food and drink companies established in 1923
Chemical companies established in 1923
Flavor companies
Food and drink companies of China
Food and drink in Hong Kong